The 2nd Security Force Assistance Brigade (2nd SFAB) is a security force assistance formation - a Security Force Assistance Brigade - of the United States Army. It is based in Fort Bragg, North Carolina, under the Security Force Assistance Command.
Security Force Assistance Brigades are the dedicated conventional organizations for conducting security force assistance around the world.

In March 2021 the brigade was announced to be aligned with United States Africa Command.

Formation 
The 2nd Brigade was established on 29 November 2018, upon return of the 1st Security Force Assistance Brigade from Afghanistan; the 2nd Security Force Assistance Brigade was scheduled to rotate in Afghanistan in Spring 2019, with assistance of some elements of the 1st SFAB.

According to Army officials, the 2nd SFAB was to report to its first combat training centre rotation in January [2019] as a culmination of its ongoing training.

Each SFAB would have a regional focus and its capabilities would enable it to perform with minimal cultural and regional orientation.

Soldiers of the Brigade underwent training for a month at Fort Benning with the Military Advisor Training Academy, before receiving additional training in foreign languages, foreign weapons, cultural mediation, culture and other fields.

Composition 
Each Security Force Assistance Brigade consists of about 800 senior and noncommissioned officers.

According to Drew Brooks from The Fayetteville Observer, members of the brigade are picked on voluntary basis among the best soldiers of other units across the Army. While not all personnel in the Brigade are meant to be advisors, all personnel are meant to be able to deploy. According to SOF News, the brigade requires over seventy different military occupational specialties, including infantry, medics, intelligence analysts, and logistics personnel.

Structure 
The 2nd Security Force Assistance Brigade consists of 800 troops, and is based on the brigade combat team model, consisting of the Brigade headquarters and of related Battalions.

Each Battalion in turn provides the combat advisor teams, the operational units of a Security Force Assistance Brigade. Each combat advisor team is a small unit, consisting of about 12 troops per team, although additional soldiers may be assigned or attached to a combat advisor team in order to provide force protection.

Garrison 
According to Fort Bragg officials, the 2nd Security Force Assistance Brigade could be housed in space previously used by the inactivated 440th Airlift Wing.

The brigade provided maintenance assistance to the 201st Regional Military Training Center, 201st Corps, Afghan National Army in late 2019-early 2020 to help maintain their 1960-vintage Soviet D-30 122mm howitzers.

References

 
 

Brigades of the United States Army
Military advisory groups
Military units and formations established in 2018